A general election was held in Minneapolis on November 5, 2013. Minneapolis's mayor was up for election as well as all the seats on the City Council, the two elected seats on the Board of Estimate and Taxation, and all the seats on the Park and Recreation Board. Voters were able to rank up to three candidates for each office in order of preference.

Mayor

Incumbent Democratic–Farmer–Labor Mayor R. T. Rybak announced on December 27, 2012, that he will not be seeking re-election. 35 candidates ran for election. Betsy Hodges was elected in the 33rd round after two days of vote tabulations.

City Council

All 13 seats on the Minneapolis City Council were up for election.

Board of Estimate and Taxation
The two elected seats on the Board of Estimate and Taxation were up for election. Incumbents Carol Becker and David Wheeler were re-elected in the first round, both having passed the threshold to be elected.

Members were elected citywide via the single transferable vote.

Candidates
Names of incumbents are italicized.

Results

Park and Recreation Board
All nine seats on the Park and Recreation Board were up for election. Three members were elected from one citywide, at-large district via the single transferable vote and six from single-member districts via instant-runoff voting.

Candidates
Names of incumbents are italicized.

Results

At-large
As no candidate passed the maximum possible threshold to be elected in the first round, several rounds of vote tabulations were necessary until three members were elected. John Erwin was elected in the fourth round and Annie Young and Meg Forney in the ninth round.

Steve Barland, Meg Forney, Jason Stone, and Tom Nordyke were candidates in the 2009 Park and Recreation Board election, but were all defeated. Barland and Stone ran in District 5 and Forney in District 6. Tom Nordyke served on the Board as an at-large member from 2006 to 2009 and as its president from 2008 to 2009.

District 1

District 2

District 3

District 4

District 5

District 6

Notes

References

External links
 Minneapolis Elections & Voter Services

2013 Minnesota elections
Local elections in Minnesota